Collin Dyer is a member of the National Assembly of Seychelles.  A businessman by profession, he is a member of the Seychelles National Party, and was first elected to the Assembly in 2002.

References
Member page on Assembly website

Year of birth missing (living people)
Living people
Members of the National Assembly (Seychelles)
People from Beau Vallon, Seychelles
Seychellois businesspeople
United Seychelles Party politicians